The Seven Early Songs (Sieben frühe Lieder) (c. 1905 – 1908), are early compositions of Alban Berg, written while he was under the tutelage of Arnold Schoenberg. They are an interesting synthesis combining Berg's heritage of pre-Schoenberg song writing with the rigour and undeniable influence of Schoenberg. The writing very much carries with it the heritage of Richard Strauss (although the influences of a number of other composers can be discerned – Robert Schumann, Gustav Mahler, and Hugo Wolf for example, as well as Claude Debussy's harmonic palette in evidence in "Nacht"), through the expansiveness of gesture and 'opening of new vistas,' and that of Richard Wagner. The songs were first written for a medium voice and piano; the composer himself revised them in 1928 for high voice and orchestra.

Structure
The seven songs are:
 Nacht (Night) – text by 
 Schilflied (Song amid the reeds) – Nikolaus Lenau 
 Die Nachtigall (The nightingale) – Theodor Storm 
 Traumgekrönt (Crowned in dream) – Rainer Maria Rilke 
 Im Zimmer (Indoors) – Johannes Schlaf 
 Liebesode (Ode to Love) –  Otto Erich Hartleben
 Sommertage (Summer days) – Paul Hohenberg

Instrumentation
The orchestral version is scored for high voice (soprano) and: 
 2 flutes (2nd doubling piccolo), 2 oboes (2nd doubling English horn), 2 clarinets in B flat, bass clarinet in A, 2 bassoons, contrabassoon;
 4 horns in F, trumpet in F, 2 tenor trombones;
 timpani, percussion (bass drum, side drum, cymbals, triangle, tam-tam), harp, celesta;
 strings:   violins I and II, violas, violoncellos, double basses.

References

Compositions by Alban Berg
1908 songs
1928 songs